Keto may refer to:

 The Ket people (also known as Кето), an ethnic group of the Siberian North
 Ceto or Keto, a sea goddess in Greek mythology
 Ketone or keto group, the functional group in the chemical compounds ketones
 Ketoconazole, a medication with antifungal and testosterone-inhibiting properties
 Keto diet, a high-fat, low-carb diet plan
 KETO-LP, a radio station licensed to serve Aurora, Colorado, United States

See also
Ceto (disambiguation)
Quito